Morombe is an urban municipality (commune urbaine) on the south-west coast in Atsimo-Andrefana, Madagascar. 
It can be reached by the National road 55 or pirogue from Morondava. It is situated at 283 km from Tulear.

An airport serves the town.

Television
For 17 years now there is no television available in Morombe. At the time the transmitter broke down, the director took it to Tulear and later to Antananarivo but it was never returned.

See also
 Morondava
 Kirindy Mitea National Park
 Mikea Forest
 Roman Catholic Diocese of Morombe

References

Populated places in Atsimo-Andrefana